The Women's sprint cross-country skiing competition in the classical technique at the 2010 Winter Olympics in Vancouver, Canada was held on 17 February at Whistler Olympic Park in Whistler, British Columbia.

Canada's Chandra Crawford was the defending Olympic champion in this event, though that event was in the freestyle technique. Italy's Arianna Follis was the defending world champion in this event which was also held in freestyle technique. Alena Procházková of Slovakia won the test event that took place at Olympic venue on 16 January 2009. The last World Cup event prior to the 2010 Games in this format took place on 6 February 2010 in Canmore, Alberta and was won by Poland's Justyna Kowalczyk.

Follis did not qualify for the event at the Winter Olympics. Crawford and Procházková were eliminated in the quarterfinals. Kowalczyk won silver. It was Bjørgen's second medal at these Olympics and first gold for her. Majdič won her first Olympic medal and the first for Slovenia in cross-country skiing. In spite of agonizing pain, she finished third in the sprint a few hours later, winning the first individual Winter Olympic medal for Slovenia in 16 years and its first ever in cross-country skiing at the Winter Olympics. She earned the highest praise from other skiers, staff and the media for her amazing bravery as she attended the medal giving ceremony with a tube in her chest to relieve pneumothorax.

Results

Qualifying
Qualifying took place at 10:15 PST.

Quarterfinals
Quarterfinals took place at 12:30 PST.
Quarterfinal 1

Quarterfinal 2

Quarterfinal 3

Quarterfinal 4

Quarterfinal 5

Semifinals
Semifinals took place at 13:20 PST.
Semifinals 1

Semifinals 2

Final
Final took place at 13:45 PST.

See also
Cross-country skiing at the 2010 Winter Paralympics – Women's 1 km Sprint Classic

References

External links
2010 Winter Olympics results: Ladies' Individual Sprint Classic, from https://web.archive.org/web/20100222080013/http://www.vancouver2010.com/ retrieved 2010-02-16.

Women's cross-country skiing at the 2010 Winter Olympics
Women's individual sprint cross-country skiing at the Winter Olympics